Cadenas de amor is a Mexican telenovela produced by Televisa and originally transmitted by Telesistema Mexicano.

Ofelia Guilmáin and Aldo Monti starred as protagonists, Angelines Fernández starred as main antagonist.

Cast 
 Ofelia Guilmáin as Ana María
 Aldo Monti as Alfredo
 Angelines Fernández as Irma
 Maruja Grifell
 María Idalia as Tina
 Antonio Passy as Federico
 Antonio Raxel
 Violet Gabriel
 Antonio Racksed

References 
Produced by: Colgate Palmolive
Producer/Camera Director: Alvaro Bauer

External links 

Mexican telenovelas
Televisa telenovelas
1959 telenovelas
1959 Mexican television series debuts
1959 Mexican television series endings
Spanish-language telenovelas